Myal is an Afro-Jamaican spirituality. It developed via the creolization of African religions during the slave era in Jamaica. It incorporates ritualistic magic, spiritual possession and dancing. Unlike Obeah, its practices focus more on the connection of spirits with humans. Over time, Myal began to meld with Christian practices and created the religious tradition known as Revivalism.

History

Origin
The practice of Myal as a spirit possession originated in Jamaica. It derived from the Kongo religion. It was once theorized to be of Akan origin, because of its popularity with Akan slaves. However, Myal was also popular with Kongo slaves. The centrality of spirit possession is a core component of both Myal and Kongo religion. This evidence suggests that Myal is more closely related to Kongo. Myalism resulted from the cooperation of ethnically diverse African slaves. The term "Myal" was first recorded by Edward Long in 1774 when describing a ritual dance done by Jamaican slaves. At first, the practices of Obeah and Myal were not distinguished. Over time, "Myal-men" involved in spirit possession became involved with Jamaican Native Baptist churches and incorporated Myal rituals into them. Over time, these Myal-influenced churches began preaching the importance of baptisms and the eradication of Obeah, thus separating the two traditions.

Christianization
After the abolition of slavery, conservative Christian churches began to lose followers to Bedwardism and Myalist Native Baptist Churches. After 1814, the Myalist chapels started to become more visible. By the 1840s, many Congolese indentured laborers arrived in Jamaica where they revitalised Myal practices and  the Kumina religion.

Myal was generally tolerated by slave owners because of its stance against Obeah and its adoption of Christian elements. By the 1860s, Myal-based churches became referred to as "Revivalist" churches and were established as Baptist churches. From 1858 to 1859, a Christian revival swept Jamaica, adding energy to local religious life. Two branches of this revival, the 60 Order or Revival Zion and the 61 Order or Pocomania, emerged. Revival Zion adopted more orthodox Christian practices, while Pocomania continued more African practices.

Myal as a separate religion is no longer practiced, its rituals can be found in Revivalism, Kumina, and Convince.

Practices

Early Myalist religion
Myalists honor a creator god and ancestor or African spirits. These spirits are invoked in Myal rituals. It holds that a human has two souls: the duppy, which departs the Earth after death, and the second spirit, which acts as the person's shadow and needs protection from evil. Under slavery, Myalists would ingest a mix of cold water and branched callaloo to induce an intoxicated state and then dance to commune with the spirits.

Revivalism
Most Revivalist faiths involve oral confessions, trances, dreams, prophesies, spirit seizures, and frenzied dancing. In Pocomania, male religious leaders are usually called "Shepherd", and in Revival Zion, the male leaders are called "Captain". Female leaders are generally called "mother".

See also
Kumina
Obeah

References

Afro-American religion
Afro-Jamaican culture
Religion in Jamaica